The women's 20 kilometres race walk event at the 1999 European Athletics U23 Championships was held in Göteborg, Sweden, on 31 July 1999.

Medalists

Results

Final
31 July

Participation
According to an unofficial count, 11 athletes from 9 countries participated in the event.

 (2)
 (1)
 (1)
 (1)
 (1)
 (1)
 (1)
 (2)
 (1)

References

20 kilometres race walk
Racewalking at the European Athletics U23 Championships